Ali Modu Sheriff (born 1956) is a Nigerian politician who served as governor of Borno State from 2003 to 2011. He was the first governor to serve two consecutive terms. 

Though Sheriff had held two elected offices as a member of All Nigeria People's Party, he would later join the All Progressives Congress becoming a founding member of that party. In 2014, Sheriff switched affiliation to the People's Democratic Party. He acted as the National Working Committee chair from 16 February 2016 until the National Convention, when he was removed and replaced by Ahmed Makarfi. On 26 April 2018 he defected back to All Progressives Congress.

Background
Ali Modu Sheriff was born in Ngala Town, Ngala Local Government Area, Borno State in 1956. His father was the business tycoon Galadima Modu Sheriff.
He attended Government Secondary School, Bama (1974–1979). He attended the London School of Business, where he studied Insurance, Banking and Finance. 
In 1981, he joined his father's construction company as a Director, later becoming Managing Director. 
In 1985, he registered his first company. His companies include Meroil Organisation and Union Chase.

He was elected as a senator from Borno during the Third Nigerian Republic under the banner of NRC, his opponent then was Kolo Kingibe, wife of the Social Democratic Party, SDP chairman, Babagana Kingibe. He was also a member of the Constitutional Conference and chaired the committee on states and local government.

Senate career
Ali Modu Sheriff was elected Senator representing Borno Central on the platform of the National Republican Convention during the Third Republic, he was again elected on the platform of the United Nigeria Congress Party (UNCP) during General Sani Abacha's military regime. 
After democracy was restored, in April 1999 he was again elected Senator, Borno Central on the platform of the All Nigeria Peoples Party (ANPP).

Governor of Borno State
In 2003, he ran for Governor of Borno State on the ANPP platform and won. He was re-elected in 2007 and sworn in on 29 May 2007.
In both cases, he defeated the PDP candidate Kashim Ibrahim-Imam.

PDP National Working Committee
During 2014, Sheriff switch affiliation to the People's Democratic Party. On 16 February 2016, he became the chairman of PDP National Working Committee (acting), serving until his removal from office at the 2016 National Convention. He was replaced by Ahmed Makarfi as Caretaker Chairman.

PDP Crisis
The Court of Appeal sitting in Port Harcourt, Rivers State, on Friday 17 February 2017 declared former Borno State Governor, Ali Modu Sheriff as the authentic National Chairman of the Peoples Democratic Party (PDP). In July 2017, following the verdict from a five-man Apex Court, Ali Modu Sheriff was removed as the PDP Chairman and Ahmed Mohammed Makarfi reinstated as the National Chairman of PDP.

Controversy
He has been accused of being a sponsor to the Islamic sect Boko Haram by an Australian hostage negotiator Stephen Davies.

See also
List of Governors of Borno State

References

External links
Nigeria: Why President Jonathan Couldn't Avoid Modu Sheriff in Chad - Aide

1956 births
Living people
Governors of Borno State
People from Borno State
Nigerian Muslims
Kanuri people
All Nigeria Peoples Party politicians
Members of the Senate (Nigeria)
Social Democratic Party (Nigeria) politicians
National Republican Convention politicians
United Nigeria Congress Party politicians
National Working Committee chairs
20th-century Nigerian politicians
21st-century Nigerian politicians